Llangennech (()) is a village and community in the area of Llanelli, Carmarthenshire, Wales, which covers an area of .

It is governed by Llangennech Community Council and Carmarthenshire County Council. Llangennech is also the name of the county electoral ward coterminous with the village. It falls in the Llanelli parliamentary and Senedd constituency. It lies in the Mid & West Wales region for regional Senedd members.

Llangennech was a coal mining community, with several local collieries mining steam coal. There is also a large Labour tradition in the village originating with the mine workers. There was a large Royal Navy depot in the village, which was closed in 2007 in Ministry of Defence restructuring.

Llangennech has a strong rugby union team, Llangennech RFC, that feeds many players into Llanelli RFC and then on to the Llanelli Scarlets regional rugby union team.

The town is served by Llangennech railway station on the Heart of Wales Line with trains to Swansea to the south and Shrewsbury to the north.

The community is bordered by the communities of Llanelli Rural, Llannon, and Llanedi, all in Carmarthenshire; and by Grovesend and Waungron and Gorseinon in the City and County of Swansea.

History

Origins 
The village has been known by many names over the years. These include Llangennydd, Llangennich, Llangenardh, Llangennach, Llangenarth, Llangenneth, Llangenyth, Llangennych and Langenardh. The likely origin of the village's name comes from the parish church, known as both St. Cennech's or St. Gwynnog's. The church is believed to have been dedicated to the brothers St. Cennydd and St. Gwynog, the sons of St. Gildas. Documents reveal that the village has commemorated St. Gwynog since at least the 16th century.

After their education, the Celtic saints who studied in Wales would become missionaries and form Christian cells. If successful, these cells would become a "Llan", an early Welsh word for enclosure.

Industry

Coal 
The village's coal industry dates back to at least the 17th century, where the Duchy of Lancaster survey in 1609 talks of a Thomas Lloyd's "coleworks" in the Allt area of the village. "Llangennech Coal", as it was known, was used extensively around the world.

The 'RN' 
Until it closed in the late 1990s, the village was home to a Royal Navy Store Depot colloquially known as the 'RN'. Though it no longer belongs to the Royal Navy, it still operates as a contractor for the Ministry of Defence. It equipped the Bronco All Terrain Tracked Carrier vehicles which were used in Afghanistan.

The Llangennech Estate 
The Llangennech Estate, covering around 4,000 acres of land, was formed between 1801 and 1803 when John Symmonds bought land from Sir John Stepney and various others. In 1804 it entered the hands of the Earl of Warwick and John Vancouver, brother of George Vancouver. After surrendering the estate back to Symmons in 1806, it was sold to the MP Edward Rose Tunno in 1821 or 1824. Tunno leased much of the estate. Thomas Margrave of the Llangennech Coal Company leased the "Llangennech Mansion" in 1826. The industrialist Richard Janion Nevill leased the mansion among other lands. He died at the Mansion in 1856 and his son and wife lived there until 1870. After Tunno's death, Edward Sartoris, Nevill's nephew and MP for Carmarthenshire, received the Llangennech estate. He went on to marry Nellie Grant, daughter of President Ulysses.

Llangennech Park House was a country estate in what is now the street Maes Tŷ Gwyn. Attempts at securing protected site status were futile and it now stands abandoned.

The Rebecca Riots 
The Bridge End toll gate stood near where The Bridge public house stands today in the village.

Whilst this is the only recorded occurrence of the Rebecca Riots in the village, residents still took part in them elsewhere. The Welshman reported that the  murderer of Sarah Williams, who is believed to be the only victim killed during the riots, was a "named shoemaker of Llangennech".

Aircraft Crashes

Piper PA-30-320 Twin Comanche 
On the 17th of March 1992, an aircraft carrying two passengers and one pilot crashed in Llangennech at 16:34 on its flight back to Haverfordwest. The pilot and front seated passenger sustained only minor injuries, whereas the other passenger suffered from a broken neck. The aircraft was damaged beyond repair.

English Electric Canberra 
During an air test flight on the 13th of January 1958, the Canberra's engine failed causing a steep dive to the ground. It crashed into marshland two hundred yards from the railway station. The only occupant, Flight Lieutenant James Turnbull Wallace, was unfortunately killed due to the crash. He is buried at Llantwit Major Cemetery. The crash caused a thirty foot crater. Eyewitness accounts suggest that a flaming parachute was seen in the air as the plane came crashing down. No one was attached. Part of the parachute was later found fifty yards from the crater.

Demographics
Llangennech community's population was 4,964, according to the 2011 census; an increase of 10.07% since the 4,510 people noted in 2001.

The 2011 census showed 39.9% of the population could speak Welsh, a fall from 46.8% in 2001.

Geography

Troserch Woodlands 
The Trosech Woodlands lie near the River Morlais, approximately one mile to the north of the village. It is owned and cared for by the Trosech Woodland Society for the benefit of the public.

Governance 

Llangennech is currently represented in parliament by Nia Griffith MP and in the Senedd by Lee Waters MS, both under the Llanelli constituency. Both are members of the Labour party.

The Local Authority for the area is Carmarthenshire County Council and the village's county councillors are Gary Jones and Jacqueline Seward.

Llangennech Community Council 
On a community level, Llangennech is run by Llangennech Community Council. It currently seats 12 councillors who are elected on a quadrennial basis. Meetings are held in the community centre and Bryn hall. The current Chair is Councillor Ian Morlais Williams of Plaid Cymru. Councillor Gary Robert Jones is the Vice Chair; he is a member of the Labour Party. They were both chosen to occupy their respective roles in the council's annual general meeting on the 16 May 2022.

Transport 

Llangennech is served by the Heart of Wales line, with trains both beginning and terminating in Swansea and Shrewsbury. The franchise for the line is currently run by Transport for Wales (TfW).

Two bus services operate in the village - the L3 and L7. These are run by First Cymru. Residents complained about the reliability of these services, leading local politicians to secure promises from the operator that the services would improve.

Derailment Incident 
On the 26th of August 2020, ten tankers derailed near the village and spilled around 446,000 litres of fuel. The area of the spillage included a site of special scientific interest (SSSI) and a special area of conservation (SAC). The incident caused major damage to these environments.

Education 

Ysgol Gymraeg Llangennech is the only school in the village. As of 2021, there were 420 pupils on roll at the school. In 2017, Carmarthenshire County Council voted 38-20 in favour of somewhat controversial plans for the school to switch from dual stream education to an exclusively Welsh-medium education. 

The school historically feeds into Ysgol Gyfun y Strade and Bryngwyn Comprehensive School for secondary education.

Sports 
In late 2018, the Llangennech and Bryn Sports Association (LBSA) was formed. It is a charitable organisation focused on promoting sports in the villages of Llangennech and Bryn, and lobbying for better sporting facilities.

Rugby 

The village's rugby team is Llangennech RFC. There are a range of age groups able to play, and the main team play in the WRU Division One West league. Notable players include the bodybuilder Flex Lewis.

Football 
The village is represented in football by Llangennech AFC.

Cricket 
Llangennech Cricket Club was founded in 1881. It has three senior sides, all playing in the South Wales Cricket Association's leagues. In 2019 the club won both the All Wales Sport midweek league and cup.

Bowls 
There is a bowling green in the village used by the Llangennech & Bryn bowls club.

Notable residents
 Eileen Beasley, Welsh language campaigner, lived here during her and her husband's campaign for Welsh language tax bills
 Harry Jones, cricketer
 Huw Edwards, BBC News presenter, lived in the village during his youth
 Hywel Teifi Edwards, Welsh historian, lecturer and author, lived in the village
 Rhys Gabe, Welsh international rugby player was born in Llangennech
 Tristan Garel Jones, Conservative politician who served as MP for Watford and later became a life peer. The family moved to Llangennech's Bridge Street when his father was posted to India during the Second World War. Jones attended the Welsh speaking village school. They lived above their uncle's newsagent shop.

References

Further reading

External links

Llangennech Community Council
Carmarthenshire County Council

Villages in Carmarthenshire
Communities in Carmarthenshire
Carmarthenshire electoral wards
Llanelli